Meg Tilly (born Margaret Elizabeth Chan on February 14, 1960) is an American-Canadian actress and writer.

For her role in the 1985 film Agnes of God, she won a Golden Globe Award and was nominated for the Academy Award for Best Supporting Actress. Her other film roles include Psycho II (1983), The Big Chill (1983), Masquerade (1988), and Valmont (1989). For her role in the television series Bomb Girls (2012–13), she won the 2013 Canadian Screen Award for Best Lead Actress in a Drama Series.

Tilly has also written multiple novels, including Porcupine (2007), which was a finalist for the Sheila A. Egoff Children's Literature Prize.

Early life
Tilly was born in Long Beach, California to Patricia Ann (née Tilly), a Canadian teacher, and businessman Harry Chan. Her father was Chinese-American, while her mother was of Irish and Finnish descent. She is the younger sister of actress Jennifer Tilly.

Following her parents' divorce when she was three, Tilly was raised by her mother and stepfather, John Ward, on rural Texada Island in British Columbia, Canada. She later claimed that Ward was a violent pedophile. At the age of 12, Tilly started taking dance lessons, in part to avoid her stepfather, and in a few years had developed into a gifted ballerina.

Tilly attended Esquimalt High School in Esquimalt, British Columbia, and also Chief Sealth International High School in Seattle, Washington where she is listed among its alumni. After graduating from high school, Tilly left home and moved to the United States to pursue a career as a professional dancer. In New York City she studied with Madame Darvash and Melissa Hayden on full scholarship. She joined the Connecticut Ballet Company. She made her screen debut (somewhat ironically) as a dancer in Alan Parker's 1980 musical drama Fame, despite the fact that Tilly's dance career had been halted in 1979, when a dance partner dropped her, leading to a serious back injury.

Career

Acting
Forced to give up dancing because of complications stemming from her back injury, Tilly moved to Los Angeles to pursue a career as an actress and studied acting under Peggy Feury. She made her television debut in the 1982 half-hour drama The Trouble with Grandpa, co-starring Elisha Cook Jr. After playing a prostitute in a second-season episode of Hill Street Blues, she appeared in her first starring role in the 1982 coming-of-age adventure film Tex with Matt Dillon.

In 1983, after she starred as the lead in the supernatural horror film One Dark Night, she appeared in Psycho II with Anthony Perkins, and Lawrence Kasdan's award-winning ensemble film The Big Chill, with Kevin Kline, Glenn Close, Tom Berenger, William Hurt, Jeff Goldblum, JoBeth Williams and Mary Kay Place. Tilly's appearance in The Big Chill, which was nominated for three Academy Awards, including Best Picture, helped her career significantly. In 1984, she starred in the movie Impulse.

Tilly was the first choice for the role of Constanze Mozart in Miloš Forman's film Amadeus, having received glowing appraisals of her rehearsal work by both her would-be costar Tom Hulce and director Forman. However, she sustained a leg injury playing soccer and had to abandon the project. The role later went to Elizabeth Berridge.

In 1985, Tilly landed the acclaimed title role in Norman Jewison's Agnes of God, appearing with Jane Fonda and Anne Bancroft. Playing the role of a novitiate nun who confesses her involvement in a virgin conception, Tilly "delivered a magnificent portrayal of a tormented young woman experiencing the ultimate crisis of faith". Tilly's critically praised performance earned her an Academy Award nomination and a Golden Globe Award.

Tilly later appeared in Valmont (1989), The Two Jakes (1990) with Jack Nicholson and Leaving Normal (1992) with Christine Lahti, as well as the 1993 horror film Body Snatchers.  After this, she stopped acting for the next 15 years.

Tilly returned to acting in 2010, portraying the Blessed Mother, a Pope-like figure in the Caprica episode "Unvanquished". In 2011 she played Martha in Edward Albee's Who's Afraid of Virginia Woolf?, presented by the Blue Bridge Repertory Theatre in Victoria, B.C.

In January 2012, Global in Canada launched the six-part Bomb Girls about women who work in a munitions factory during World War II.  Tilly stars as Lorna, the emotionally closed floor matron who blossoms as a leader and an appealing woman. She won the 2013 Lead Actress, Drama Canadian Screen Award for her work on the series.

Writing
Tilly is the author of multiple published novels. In 1994, Tilly's first novel Singing Songs was published by Dutton to generally positive reviews. Donna Rifkind from Publishers Weekly called the book "an impressive first novel", and the New York Times Book Review praised Tilly for "the remarkable coherence and clarity" of Anna's narrative voice. The book is about a young girl and her sisters living in the Northwest who are molested by their stepfather.

Her second novel Gemma was published in 2006 by the Syren Book Company. and picked up by St. Martin's Press in 2010. The book is about a twelve-year-old girl who is kidnapped and taken on a cross-country journey in which she is physically and sexually abused by her captor.

Her third novel Porcupine was published in 2007 by Tundra Books. The book is about a twelve-year-old girl, Jacqueline "Jack" Cooper, whose life is shattered by the death of her father by friendly fire in the War in Afghanistan. Porcupine was a finalist for the Sheila A. Egoff Children's Literature Prize, shortlisted for The Canadian Libraries Association Best Children's Book 2008, Foreword Magazine Book of the Year and was an Ontario Library Best Bets 2008.

Her fourth novel First Time was published in 2008 by Orca Book Publishers. The novel is about a sixteen-year-old who is molested and physically abused by her mother's boyfriend, and must deal with the trauma alone without the help of her mother or best friend. First Time was a 2009 Golden Eagle Award Nominee, a 2009 YALSA Quick Picks and 2010 CCBC Best Books.

Tilly's fifth novel A Taste of Heaven was published in 2013 by Puffin Books. A departure from the darker themes of Tilly's previous work, the novel is about two young girls who become friends who experience the "comical, sometimes bittersweet and melodramatic trials and tribulations of tweenhood". One reviewer wrote, "Tilly paints an insightful, memorable portrait of the ups and downs of friendship and the unwavering bonds of family, delving into age-old issues of honesty, trust, and loyalty. A Taste Of Heaven was shortlisted for the 2014 Libris Young Reader Book of the Year, a 2014 Diamond Willow Award and won the 2014/2015 Chocolate Lilly Award.

Her sixth novel, Behind the Scenes, was published in 2014 by Puffin Books (Canada).

In 2018, Tilly published the first of three books in her Solace Island trilogy, a series of romantic thrillers about a young woman, Maggie Harris, dating a mysterious handsome man after recently being dumped by her fiancé. It was quickly followed by two sequels, Cliff's Edge and Hidden Cove.

In 2021, Tilly's latest novel, the new romantic thriller,The Runaway Heiress, was published.

Personal life
In 1983, Tilly married Tim Zinnemann, an American film producer and son of film director Fred Zinnemann. They met on the set of her first film, Tex. The couple had two children, Emily (born 1984) and David (born 1986). The marriage ended in divorce in 1989.

In 1989, Tilly began a 5-year relationship with British actor Colin Firth, whom she met during the filming of Valmont. They moved from Los Angeles to a log house on five acres of mountainside property about an hour outside Vancouver near the town of Maple Ridge, British Columbia. They have one son, William Joseph (born 1990).

In 1995, Tilly married John Calley, an American film studio executive and producer 30 years her senior. They moved to Los Angeles, where Calley worked as president and CEO of Sony Pictures Entertainment. The marriage ended in divorce in 2002.

In 2002, Tilly married her current husband, author Don Calame, who writes fiction for adolescents. They met during a writing seminar in Big Sur, California. Since 1999, she has resided in the Gulf Islands, British Columbia.

Filmography

Film

Television

Awards and nominations

Works and publications 
 
 
 
 
 
 
 
 Tilly, Meg (2019). Cliff's Edge. New York, NY: Berkley. ISBN 978-0-440-00054-9.
 Tilly, Meg (2019). Hidden Edge. New York, NY: Berkley. ISBN 978-0-440-00056-3.
 Tilly, Meg (2021). The Runaway Heiress. New York, NY: Berkley. ISBN 978-0-593-20108-4.

References

External links

 
 

1960 births
Living people
20th-century American actresses
20th-century American novelists
21st-century American actresses
21st-century American novelists
20th-century Canadian actresses
20th-century Canadian novelists
21st-century Canadian actresses
21st-century Canadian novelists
Actresses from California
American actresses of Chinese descent
American emigrants to Canada
American female dancers
American dancers
American film actresses
American musical theatre actresses
American people of Canadian descent
American people of Finnish descent
American people of Irish descent
American television actresses
American women novelists
American writers of Chinese descent
Best Supporting Actress Golden Globe (film) winners
Canadian actresses of Chinese descent
Canadian film actresses
Canadian musical theatre actresses
Canadian television actresses
Canadian people of Finnish descent
Canadian people of Irish descent
Canadian writers of Asian descent
Canadian women novelists
20th-century Canadian women writers
21st-century Canadian women writers
Best Actress in a Drama Series Canadian Screen Award winners